Barton Ford Haynes is an American physician and immunologist internationally recognized for work in T-cell immunology, retrovirology, and HIV vaccine development.  Haynes is a Frederic M. Hanes Professor of Medicine and Immunology at Duke University Medical Center. He is the director of the Duke Human Vaccine Institute and the Duke Center for HIV/AIDS Vaccine Immunology and Immunogen Discovery (CHAVI-ID), which was funded by the National Institute of Allergy and Infectious Diseases (NIAID) in 2012. In addition, Haynes directs the B-cell Lineage Envelope Design Study, the Centralized Envelope Phase I Study, and the Role of IgA in HIV-1 Protection Study as part of the Collaboration for AIDS Vaccine Discovery (CAVD), which was funded by the Bill and Melinda Gates Foundation in 2006.

Haynes was the director of the Center for HIV/AIDS Vaccine Immunology (CHAVI), which was funded by the NIAID from 2005 to 2011 to overcome obstacles to HIV vaccine development. The "big science" approach of the CHAVI grant enabled the following scientific discoveries by the CHAVI team: 1) the delineation of HIV-1 transmitted/founder viruses that are responsible for the transmission of HIV/AIDS; 2) the discovery of host tolerance mechanisms that limit the induction of broad neutralizing antibodies in HIV-1 infection; 3) the fine mapping and delineation of the immunological events that transpire during the earliest days of HIV-1 infection; 4) the discovery of new genes and gene mutations/duplications that contribute to HIV-1 control and progression; 5) the design of mosaic T cell and B cell Env vaccine candidates to overcome HIV diversity; 6) the discovery of the immune correlates of risk of infection in the RV144 trial; 7) the isolation of rare broad neutralizing HIV antibodies and their ancestor antibodies; and 8)  the development of a new strategy for vaccine development called B Cell Lineage Immunogen Design. He led the group that deciphered the maturation pathways of several types of broadly neutralizing antibodies that point the way to vaccine designs, and has worked out the immunobiology of HIV-host interactions that control broad neutralizing antibody development.

Haynes received his bachelor's degree from the University of Tennessee in 1969 and his M.D. from Baylor College of Medicine in 1973. He completed his internship and residency at Duke University Medical Center in 1975.  After conducting research for five years at the National Institute of Allergy and Infectious Diseases from 1975 to 1980, Haynes returned to Duke as a member of the faculty in the department of medicine in 1980.  He served as Chief of the Division of Rheumatology, Allergy and Clinical Immunology from 1987 to 1995, and as chair of the department of medicine from 1995 to 2002 at Duke University Medical Center.  Haynes established the Duke Human Vaccine Institute in 1990 to support interdisciplinary efforts across Duke to develop vaccines and therapeutics for HIV and other emerging infections.

Haynes served as a member of the NIAID Advisory Council, Chairman of the National Academy of Sciences Institute of Medicine Roundtable for Development for Drugs and Vaccines against AIDS, and currently is chair of the NIAID AIDS Vaccine Research Working Group that advises the National Institutes of Health (NIH) regarding the national HIV vaccine effort. Haynes served on the NIAID Blue Ribbon Committees on Bioterrorism and Emerging Infections held in February and October 2002. He received the Alexander Fleming Award for Lifetime Achievement from the Infectious Diseases Society of America in 2011 and the Ralph Steinman Award for Human Immunology Research from the American Association of Immunologists in 2013. He was the recipient of the Duke Award for Basic Science Mentoring in 2011. Haynes is a Fellow of the Infectious Diseases Society of America and is a member of the Association of American Physicians, the National Academy of Sciences Institute of Medicine, the National Academy of Inventors and the American Academy of Arts and Sciences.

References

American immunologists
Members of the United States National Academy of Sciences
Living people
Year of birth missing (living people)
Fellows of the Infectious Diseases Society of America
Members of the National Academy of Medicine